Dr. Ibrahim Abdurrahman Farajajé (December 19, 1952 – February 9, 2016), formerly known as Elias Frajajé-Jones, was a queer theologian, AIDS activist, scholar, spiritual leader, academic and professor.

Farajajé was raised in Berkeley, California in an ethnically and religiously diverse environment. His parents were both education activists. He was one of the first black male students at Vassar College where he received a bachelor’s degree in religion in 1972. He went on to teach at Howard University School of Divinity in 1986. In the Eastern Orthodox Church, Farajajé was an ordained priest in the Santería religion. In 1995 he started as a faculty member at Starr King School for the Ministry. At Starr King, Farajajé was a provost and professor of cultural studies and Islamic studies until his death in 2016.

Early life  

Farajajé grew up in a progressive, racially, and economically mixed neighborhood. His extended and immediate family was said to be religiously and ethnically mixed. He credits his parents for his knowledge on the importance of advocacy and social justice. Growing up, Farajajé had tutors for school to stay ahead and a second language tutor and learnt many languages like Spanish and French during this time. He is the first of his biological and adopted siblings. He credits his upbringing for his educational excellency, leadership skills, public speaking skills and his sense of social responsibility.

Early activism 
Farajajé grew up exposed to many religions like various forms of Christianity, Protestant, Roman Catholic and Judaism. At age 13 he was exposed to Islam while attending boarding school and was exposed to Buddhism through his father. As a child he was baptized but was not exclusively in a particular faith or religion. He credits his professors at boarding school for his initial interest in Islam and in 1966-67 was the starting point of him self-identifying as an anti-Zionist and pro-Palestinian.

Farajajé credits his high school education for exposing him to queerness in a positive light. He states in an interview with LGBTQ Religious Archives Network that he did not have a background of hearing anti-LGBTQ preachings when he started his path of becoming a religious scholar. He states that his mindset on queerness, sexuality, and gender was neutral which he credits to the fact that he was surrounded by queerness and learning about these issues in a neutral way.  Farajajé stated in the same interview that his university experience at Vassar College was surrounded by women. He credits his feminist education to his time at Vassar College. On getting his degree in an Orthodox seminary at Oxford, Farajajé states that his goal was to study and learn, not to be ordained. In the late 1970s while finishing his dissertation in Switzerland, Farajajé became involved in a theatre collective involved in feminist, anarchist and queer spaces. On his time at Howard University, Farajajé speaks on wanting to teach at a black school after his experience of xenophobia in Switzerland. He moved back to the United States in 1985 and started teaching at Howard University in 1986.

Beliefs and activist work 
Farajajé religion was Islamic Sufism. Sufism is a form of Islam, a type of mysticism. In Washington D.C. in the 1980s, Farajajé was one of the few religious scholars to be an HIV/AIDS advocate. As an advocate for the queer community, Farajajé was one of the first black theologians that self-identified as queer. Farajajé was against the essentialist way of looking at gender and race. He preferred a more fluid approach to conceptualizing identity. From the beginning of his career, Farajajé was a scholar of Christianity, Judaism, Islam, queerness, and queer theology. He developed a program at Howard University that taught African American religious leaders on how to respond to the HIV/AIDS crisis. In the class, his students would be trained on how to be HIV test counselors, and he had people affected by HIV/AIDS speak to his students.

In 1987, Farajajé was the host the co-director of a TV series for Howard University and their affiliate Howard University Mass Media, TV-32, Washington, D. C. (WHMM). During his time at Howard University, in 1988 Farajajé co-directed "Conviction: A Healing Stream", a performance that spoke on the black religious communities and their unwillingness to bury HIV/Aids victims. Farajajé organized the healing service in Washington D.C. with different churches and HIV agency groups coming together for this service. This performance was based on the story of Antigone. The performance was about a woman who had to negotiate with a pastor so she could bury her son who was a victim of HIV. At the end of the performance/service there was a fake funeral in which the audience was asked to view the “body” which turned out to be a mirror, so when the audience members approached the casket they saw themselves, communicating that the victims of HIV/AIDS could be anyone.

After this performance, Farajajé developed a course in which he framed sexuality in the context of imperialism, colonialism and racism. The course, called “Sociology of Hetero Patriarchy”, looked at the connection and intersections between different modes and tools of oppression. Farajajé made it a requirement for the students of this class to spend time in the queer community to understand oppression from their point of view. He became a faculty advisor for an LGBT group at Howard University, legitimizing the existing LGBT group that existed at Howard University. The group looked into African traditional religions and derived their name “Oxala” from an African Yoruba deity that combined genders.

In 1986, Farajajé received his doctorate in theology. By 1993 Farajajé was in his fight as an activist for HIV/AIDS, sacred sex and eroticism of black males. He believed these issues encompassed the word “queer”. In Black Theology: A Documentary History (Vol 2), Farajajé wrote “Breaking Silence: An In-the-Life Theology”, in this he speaks on ending homophobia and biphobia in society, in the “black church” and in the context of black theology. In his Breaking Silence essay, Farajajé speaks on homophobia and biphobia particularly how queer liberation theology should acknowledge that queer black people face oppression from white people and black heterosexual communities. He also argued that the black church community forces black queer people to keep their sexuality hidden. Farajajé also states that this treatment of the black queer community is used to foster self-hatred in the black queer community, and is one of the main reasons why society, specifically the United States of America, was not more vigilant in dealing with the HIV/AIDS crisis in the 1980s. This essay argued that being forced to keep their identities a secret leads to more unsafe decisions that lead to the rise of HIV/AIDS. Farajajé main resolution for this issue was to engage in theology that reduces the isolation of black queer people from the black community.

In 1990 Farajajé wrote In Search of Zion: The Spiritual Significance of Africa for Three Black Religious Movements. The book studies the religious and theological roots of Afrocentrism. It touches on the African American reinterpretations of Christianity. The context behind the book was the separation of African American communities in the 19th and 20th century.

Politically, Farajajé described himself as an anarchist. In D.C he was very active in the “ACT UP” group and was arrested for civil disobedience around HIV activism. He was also on a chair of political action committee for the D.C Black Queer Coalition, where he made TV appearances.

Early works: 
 "Other Voices" (1987)
 "Conviction: A Healing Stream.” (1988)
 African Creative Expressions (1991)
 In Search of Zion: Spiritual Significance of Africa in Black Religious Movements (1990)
 "Breaking Silence: an in-the-life theology" (Published in Black Theology: A Documentary History Vol 2 1980-1992) (1992)
 Piercing analysis/ or In-to-body Travel/ or What is All that Piercing Stuff?” (1995)

References 

1952 births
2016 deaths
Queer theologians
HIV/AIDS activists
Members of ACT UP
African-American religious leaders
American Santeríans
Vassar College alumni
Howard University faculty